"Blue Tacoma" is a song co-written and recorded by American country music singer Russell Dickerson. It is the second single from his 2017 debut album Yours and the follow-up to his debut single, also titled "Yours". Dickerson wrote the song with Parker Welling and Casey Brown, the latter of whom also produced it.

Content
Carena Liptak of The Boot said that the song is about "a vivid picture of falling in love to the backdrop of gorgeous California scenery, all in a Toyota Tacoma." Dickerson said that the song was originally about taking a road trip, but after presenting his cowriters with the idea, they chose to add details that Dickerson had witnessed while driving down the Pacific Coast Highway with his wife, Kailey.

Music video
Kailey Dickerson and her brother, Toben Seymour, directed the song's music video, which features footage of her and her husband driving along the highway.

Commercial performance
The song has sold 87,000 copies in the United States as of November 2018.

Charts

Weekly charts

Year-end charts

Certifications and sales

References

2018 singles
2018 songs
Songs about cars
Russell Dickerson songs
Songs written by Russell Dickerson
Thirty Tigers singles